George Heinz (8 October 1891 – 3 October 1966) was an Australian rules footballer who played for Geelong, Melbourne and St Kilda in the Victorian Football League (VFL). He was born George Heinz but later in his career chose to be known as George Haines due to the bad feeling the country had towards Germany during World War I.

Heinz played as a rover and made his debut in 1910 for his local club Geelong. The following season he represented Victoria at the Adelaide Carnival. He played his last game for Geelong in 1914 before joining the AIF and missing the next four seasons due to war commitments.

When he returned in 1919 it was with Melbourne and he was named as captain-coach.  The club did not win a game all season and he lost his coaching job, although he remained captain for 1920.

In 1927 he was appointed non-playing coach of St Kilda, but played and captained them once when they were a player short.

External links

 
 

1891 births
1966 deaths
People educated at Geelong College
Australian rules footballers from Ballarat
Australian Rules footballers: place kick exponents
Geelong Football Club players
Melbourne Football Club players
Melbourne Football Club coaches
St Kilda Football Club coaches
St Kilda Football Club players
Melbourne Football Club captains
Australian military personnel of World War I
Military personnel from Victoria (Australia)